Mokhovo is a rural locality (a village) in Dobryansky District, Perm Krai, Russia. The population was 61 as of 2010. There are 26 streets.

Geography 
Mokhovo is located 41 km south of Dobryanka (the district's administrative centre) by road. Zaborye is the nearest rural locality.

References 

Rural localities in Dobryansky District